Alexey Vladimirovich Tsoi (born 2 April 1977) is a Kazakh politician of who served as the Minister of Healthcare from June 2020 to December 2021

Early life and education 
Tsoi was born in Chimkent (now Shymkent) in 1977. In 2001, he graduated from the South Kazakhstan Medical Academy. In 2007, he finished Daneker Institute of International Law and International Business and then the Higher School of Corporate Management of the Russian Presidential Academy of National Economy and Public Administration and International Business Academy in 2015.

Early career 
From 2001 to 2007, Tsoi was an endoscopist surgeon, senior researcher at the Center for Reconstructive Surgery and Transplantology, leading researcher at the Center for Internal Medicine, RSE “National Scientific Medical Center” of the Ministry of Healthcare. In 2002, he became the Territory Development Manager for Astana, GlaxoSmithKline pharmaceutical company. Until 2009, he served as the Secretary General of the Public Association “Eurasian Respiratory Society”. Tsoi worked as the director of the RSE “Center for the Implementation of Modern Medical Technologies” in the Office of the President of Kazakhstan. From 2010, he served as the head of the State Institution “Medical Center for the Administration of the President of the Republic of Kazakhstan” and the editor-in-chief of the journal “Vestnik MC UDP RK”. In 2011, Tsoi became the head doctor of the emergency room at the City Hospital No. 1 of the Astana City Akimat.

Political career 
On 30 December 2014, Tsoi was appointed as the Vice Minister of Health and Social Protection of Kazakhstan. After the ministry was separated, Tsoi was appointed as the Vice Minister of Healthcare on 17 February 2017. On 19 February 2019, Tsoi became the head of the Medical Center of the Office of the President. 

After Minister of Healthcare Eljan Birtanov had tested positive for COVID-19, Tsoi was appointed as Acting and the First Vice Minister of Healthcare on 22 June 2020. Three days later, on 25 June, Birtanov announced his resignation from the post as the Minister. As a result, he was succeeded by Tsoi who became the new minister.

October 31, 2022 has been appointed head of the Medical Center of the Ministry of Internal Affairs of the Republic of Kazakhstan.

References 

21st-century Kazakhstani politicians
Living people
1977 births
Koryo-saram
Kazakhstani people of Korean descent